The Intellectual Property Act 2014 is an Act of the Parliament of the United Kingdom that received Royal Assent on 14 May 2014 after being introduced on 9 May 2013. The purpose of the legislation was to update copyright law, in particular design and patent law. The law arose as a result of the Hargreaves Review of Intellectual Property and Growth.

References

United Kingdom Acts of Parliament 2014